Lawrence Brock (August 16, 1906 – August 28, 1968) was a Nebraska Democratic politician.

Brock was born near Columbus, Nebraska. He graduated from Leigh High School and then the College of Pharmacy of the University of Nebraska-Lincoln in 1929. He became a pharmacist in Madison, Nebraska. He then became a cattle feeder and farmer and the president of Nebraska Livestock Feeders Association, Cornbelt Livestock Feeders Association, and Northeast Nebraska Rural Electric Association.

Brock was a member of the Nebraska Highway Advisory Commission and then a delegate to the 1956 Democratic National Convention He was the chair of the Nebraska Democratic Party from 1954 to 1956. In 1958 he was elected to the Eighty-sixth United States Congress serving from January 3, 1959 to January 3, 1961, and failed in his bid to be reelected in 1960. He was then appointed in February 1961 as the administrator of the Farmers Home Administration in Washington, D.C. He died in Zion, Illinois and was buried in Wakefield Cemetery in Wakefield, Nebraska.

References 
 
 
 
 

1906 births
1968 deaths
University of Nebraska–Lincoln alumni
American pharmacists
People from Columbus, Nebraska
Democratic Party members of the United States House of Representatives from Nebraska
20th-century American politicians
People from Madison, Nebraska
United States Department of Agriculture officials